Events in the year 1760 in India.

Events
National income - ₹9,059 million
 French defeat at the Battle of Wandewash.
 Maratha capture Delhi.
 The East India Company had gained political and economic power over India.

References

 
India
Years of the 18th century in India